Iñupiaq Braille is a braille alphabet of the Inupiat language maintained by the Alaskan Department of Education.

Chart
The print digraphs ch and sr are digraphs in braille as well.  The alphabet is,

{| class="wikitable Unicode" style="line-height: 1.2"
|- align=center
|  a
|colspan=2|  ch
|  g
|  ġ
|  h
|  i
|  k
|  ḳ
|  l
|  ḷ
|  ł
|  ł̣
|  m
|-align=center
|  n
|  ñ
|  ŋ
|  p
|  q
|  r
|  s
|colspan=2|  sr
|  t
|  ṭ
|  u
|  v
|  y
|}

 for ñ is from Spanish Braille.  ŋ and ṭ are the mirror-image of n and t.  Ł is from English Braille th, the English sound which is closest to it.  Ḳ and ṭ are only found in older texts.  Punctuation is the same as in English Braille.

References

See also
Inuktitut Braille

French-ordered braille alphabets
Inupiat language